I-f (also Interr-Ference) is the stage name of Ferenc E. van der Sluijs, a Dutch producer and DJ based in The Hague. He is a former member of the Dutch techno-pioneers Unit Moebius.

Overview

In 1997 he produced the track "Space Invaders Are Smoking Grass", which became a huge underground dance hit and is often cited as an early example of electroclash. It introduced "old-fashioned verse-chorus dynamics to burbling electro in a vocodered homage to Atari-era hi-jinks" and is the "record widely credited with catalysing" the electroclash movement.

The album Fucking Consumer was released in 1998 on the Disko B label, followed by The Man From Pack the next year. In 1999 he also made the mixed album Mixed Up In the Hague Vol. 1, which has been cited by many, including Morgan Geist, as being the catalyst that brought renewed interest in Italo disco.

I-f was featured on the seminal 2002 Ghostly International compilation Disco Nouveau. He has also recorded as The Parallax Corporation with Intergalactic Gary. I-f currently runs a record label called Viewlexx. He also ran the internet radio station Cybernetic Broadcasting System (CBS). It was closed down in 2008 but is now one of four channels on Intergalactic FM, which is also operated by I-f.

Discography
 1995 – Portrait Of A Dead Girl 1: The Cause
 1997 – The Brown Elbow Conspiracy
 1997 – "Space Invaders Are Smoking Grass"
 1997 – Playstation #2
 1998 – Fucking Consumer
 1999 – The Man From Pack

See also
Intergalactic FM

References

External links

I-f @ Discogs.com
I-f @ Resident Advisor
RobotDJ.net
The Hotmix Foundation
Intergalactic FM
Viewlexx

Musicians from The Hague
Dutch electronic musicians
Dutch DJs
Electro musicians
Living people
Year of birth missing (living people)
Electronic dance music DJs